AfroCrowd (stylized as AfroCROWD) is an initiative to create and improve information about Black culture and history on Wikipedia. The New York City-based project was founded by Alice Backer in 2015.

Background and description

Some observers have noted a dearth in content pertaining to sub-Saharan African history on Wikipedia.

In 2015, Daniella Bien-Aime of The Haitian Times called AfroCrowd "a multilingual initiative to increase Afrodescendant participation in crowdsourcing initiatives such as Wikipedia". Described as a "do-it-yourself initiative", AfroCROWD hosts edit-a-thons and talks across the New York metropolitan area. The group has partnered with the Brooklyn Public Library and other organizations such as the Haiti Cultural Exchange and Haitian Creole Language Institute to host these events. AfroCROWD also seeks to increase the number of people of African descent who actively take part in the Wikimedia and open knowledge movements.

History 

In 2015, lawyer Alice Backer launched AfroCROWD to "rectify Wikipedia's lack of articles about black history and black culture". According to Backer, the aim of the project is to "give people of color opportunities to do more than participate in and consume social media". Daniella Bien-Aime included Backer in The Haitian Times' 2015 list of 10 "Haitian social media influencers you should follow". 

In 2020, leading up to Juneteenth, AfroCrowd hosted efforts to improve Wikipedia articles related to civil rights. The group has received funding from the Wikimedia Foundation.

See also
 Afripedia Project
 Black Lunch Table

References

Further reading

External links

 
 AfroCROWD Wikipedia Meetup page

2015 establishments in New York City
African-American culture
African-American history in New York City
Organizations based in New York City
Organizations established in 2015
Post–civil rights era in African-American history
Wikipedia